Kristijan Mesaroš (born 2 July 1988) is a Croatian tennis player playing on the ITF Futures Tour and the ATP Challenger Tour.

References

External links
 
 

1988 births
Living people
Sportspeople from Slavonski Brod
Croatian male tennis players

Croatian people of Hungarian descent
21st-century Croatian people